Carter Smylie Kaufman (born November 30, 1991) is an American professional golfer who played on the PGA Tour.

Early life and career
Kaufman was born in Birmingham, Alabama. He attended Vestavia Hills High School. His middle name is a tribute to his grandmother's cousin, Smylie Gebhart, who was an All-American defensive end for Georgia Tech in 1971. His grandfather, Alan Kaufman, was head coach of the men's golf team at the University of Alabama at Birmingham.

Kaufman played college golf at Louisiana State University. He turned professional after graduating in 2014; in December 2014 he tied for 67th place at the Web.com Tour Qualifying School final stage.

Professional career
Kaufman played on the Web.com Tour in 2015. After missing the cut in his first three tournaments, he finished T-4 in the next two and won the third, the United Leasing Championship to claim his first professional title. He finished the year sixth on the money list to earn his card for the 2016 PGA Tour season.

On October 25, 2015, Kaufman earned his first victory on the PGA Tour by winning the Shriners Hospitals for Children Open by a single stroke over six players. In the final round, he came from seven strokes back after a round of 61, that included eight birdies and an eagle, to claim his maiden victory. This earned him a place into the 2016 Masters Tournament and 2016 PGA Championship. 

At the 2016 Masters Tournament, Kaufman shot a 69 during the third round, which was the best of the day in tough scoring conditions. As a result, he played in the last group during the final round, alongside defending champion Jordan Spieth. He endured a tough final round and shot a nine-over-par 81 for a T29 placing.

Amateur wins
2011 Alabama Amateur

Professional wins (2)

PGA Tour wins (1)

Web.com Tour wins (1)

Results in major championships

CUT = missed the half-way cut
"T" = tied

Results in The Players Championship

CUT = missed the halfway cut
"T" indicates a tie for a place

Results in World Golf Championships

"T" = Tied

See also
 2015 Web.com Tour Finals graduates

References

External links

American male golfers
LSU Tigers golfers
PGA Tour golfers
Korn Ferry Tour graduates
Golfers from Birmingham, Alabama
1991 births
Living people